Neocoleoidea is a large group of marine cephalopods. This cohort contains two extant groups: Decapodiformes (squid, cuttlefish, and relatives) and Octopodiformes (octopuses and the vampire squid). Species within this group exist in all major habitats in the ocean, in both the southern and northern polar regions, and from intertidal zones to great depths.  Whilst conventionally held to be monophyletic, the only morphological character for the group is the presence of suckers: although the presence of these features in the belemnites suggests that they do not support the Neocoleoidea, and hence that the group may be paraphyletic.

Taxonomy
Superorder Decapodiformes
Order Spirulida: ram's horn squid
Order Sepiida: cuttlefish
Order Sepiolida: bobtail squid
Order Teuthida: squid
Superorder Octopodiformes
Family †Trachyteuthididae (incertae sedis)
Order Vampyromorphida: vampire squid
Order Octopoda: octopus
Superorder †Palaeoteuthomorpha
Order †Boletzkyida

References

 Taxonomy Netherlands

Coleoidea